Bjørn Iversen Paulsen (born 2 July 1991) is a Danish professional footballer who plays for OB in the Danish Superliga. Primarily a centre back, he is known for his versatility in playing several positions on the pitch.

Early life
Paulsen was born in Augustenborg and started his youth career in local clubs Midtals, Haderslev and Sønderborg. On 1 January 2007, he joined the youth ranks of SønderjyskE.

Club career

SønderjyskE
Paulsen made his debut for SønderjyskE in the Superliga during the 2009–10 season, coming on as a late sub in a 1–3 away loss against Nordsjælland on 25 April 2010 at age 19.

In 2010–11, Paulsen played 21 games. His first start for SønderjyskE came on 14 August 2010, home at Haderslev Football Stadium, in a 1–3 loss against Odense. A week later, in a 2–0 win against Horsens, Paulsen provided his first assist in the Danish top tier.

The following campaign, in 2011–12, Paulsen played 19 games under the reign of new manager Lars Søndergaard. He provided three assists during the season and scored his first Superliga goal in a fixture against Aalborg on 23 May 2012, in the 75th minute as SønderjyskE won 5–0.

In 2012–13, Paulsen established himself as an important first team player for SønderjyskE. He appeared in 31 games, scoring three goals.

During the upcoming two seasons, Paulsen developed his play dramatically and progressed to become a highly rated defender and midfielder in the Superliga. He was also assigned the role as vice captain at SønderjyskE. The club finished 10th in the table, just above the relegation zone, in both 2013–14 and 2014–15. Paulsen played 32 games and scored four goals in both of the separate campaigns.

Ahead of the 2015–16 season, Jakob Michelsen was appointed as the new manager of SønderjyskE. Paulsen played an integral part during his first months at the club, appearing in the seven first fixtures of the campaign.

Esbjerg
On 31 August 2015, on the closing day of the international transfer window, Paulsen transferred to Esbjerg fB in the same league. Reports suggested a fee of 5 million Danish kroner (approximately £0,6 million), as Paulsen signed a four-year deal.

He made his debut on 14 September 2015, home at Blue Water Arena, in a 4–2 win against Odense BK. Paulsen started out playing as a central defender, but in October the same year, Esbjerg appointed Jonas Dal as their new manager. He used Paulsen at different outfields position, mainly in either one of the offensive winger positions.

Paulsen scored his first goal for Esbjerg against domestic giants F.C. Copenhagen on 28 February 2016, an equalizer as Esbjerg eventually lost 2–1 on away turf. In total, Paulsen made 25 league appearances in the campaign, scoring three goals, whilst being an important member of the Esbjerg squad.

During the upcoming season, in 2016–17, Paulsen continued to play at either flank during the reign of new manager Colin Todd. However, the results during the first half went against Esbjerg, that soon found themselves at the foot of the table. Paulsen was named as one of five players that could be deemed surplus to requirements at the club during the January transfer window, due to his reportedly high salary.

Hammarby IF
On 16 January 2017, Paulsen was sold to the Swedish club Hammarby IF in Allsvenskan. He signed a three-year deal and rejoined Jakob Michelsen, his former manager from SønderjyskE. The fee was reported as being 1.6 million Danish kroner (approximately £200,000). On 9 April, he scored his first competitive goal for Hammarby, a late equalizer as his side drew 1–1 against Kalmar FF on the second matchday of the league campaign. On 29 April, Paulsen scored a brace as Hammarby defeated the newly promoted side AFC Eskilstuna in a 4–0 win. He scored another two goals as Hammarby won against IF Elfsborg on 24 July, with Paulsen deciding the result to 2–1. Throughout the season, Paulsen played 29 league games and scored eight goals in total, being voted Hammarby Player of the Year for 2017 by the supporters of the club.

In August 2018, following a number of impressive performances in the central defender position, Paulsen attracted interest from AEK Athens. Hammarby reportedly turned down an offer of around 8.4 million Swedish kronor (approximately £700,000) from the Superleague Greece club. He eventually played 29 league games during the 2018 Allsvenskan season, scoring five goals, as Hammarby finished fourth in the league. He was nominated for the prize Allsvenskan defender of the year, that eventually was awarded to Per Karlsson, and chosen as one of the eleven best players of the season by Cmore Sports, Fotbollskanalen and Playmaker.

FC Ingolstadt
On 7 January 2019, Paulsen completed a transfer to FC Ingolstadt in the 2. Bundesliga for an undisclosed fee. He signed a two and a half-year contract with the German club. In the 2018–19 2. Bundesliga, Paulsen played 16 games and scored twice, as Ingolstadt finished 16th in the table and lost the relegation playoff against SV Wehen Wiesbaden on away goals.

In the 2019–20 3. Liga season, Paulsen made 30 league appearances for Ingolstadt, as the club qualified for the promotion playoffs but lost to FC Nürnberg on away goals. In 2020–21, Paulsen played 28 games as Ingolstadt reached the playoff once again and succeeded to win a promotion to the 2. Bundesliga, through a 4–3 win on aggregate against VfL Osnabrück. At the end of the season, Paulsen was named in the official Team of the Season of 3. Liga as one of three centre-backs. On 31 May 2021, Paulsen left Ingolstadt at the expiration of his contract.

Return to Hammarby
On 4 June 2021, Paulsen returned to his former club Hammarby IF in Allsvenskan, signing a three and a half-year contract. The transfer came to effect on 15 July the same year, at the start of the summer transfer window. He featured in all six games as the side reached the play-off round of the 2021–22 UEFA Europa Conference League, after eliminating Maribor (4–1 on aggregate) and FK Čukarički (6–4 on aggregate, in which Paulsen scored), where the club was knocked out by Basel (4–4 on aggregate) after a penalty shoot-out.

Paulsen featured in the final of the 2021–22 Svenska Cupen, in which Hammarby lost by 4–5 on penalties to Malmö FF after the game ended in a 0–0 draw.

OB
On 11 July 2022, Paulsen returned to the Danish Superliga for an undisclosed fee, signing a three-year contract with OB.

Style of play
Paulsen prefers to play as a central defender. However, he has been known as a utility player throughout his whole career in Denmark, making appearances in almost every outfield position during his time with both SønderjyskE and Esbjerg. At Hammarby, Paulsen started out playing as a central offensive midfielder, before pairing up with compatriot Mads Fenger in the central defence during the second half of the 2017 season.

International career
Paulsen won two caps for the Danish U-20 national team during the SuperCupNI in 2010. He scored a brace in a fixture against Japan during the same tournament.

Career statistics

Club

Honours
Individual
 Hammarby IF Player of the Year: 2017

References

External links 
 
 

1991 births
Living people
People from Augustenborg, Denmark
People from Sønderborg Municipality
Expatriate footballers in Sweden
Association football midfielders
Association football defenders
Danish men's footballers
Denmark youth international footballers
Danish expatriate men's footballers
Danish Superliga players
Allsvenskan players
2. Bundesliga players
3. Liga players
FC Sønderborg players
SønderjyskE Fodbold players
Esbjerg fB players
Hammarby Fotboll players
FC Ingolstadt 04 players
Odense Boldklub players
Sportspeople from the Region of Southern Denmark